Stephano is a retrograde irregular satellite of Uranus. It was discovered by Brett J. Gladman, et al. in 1999, and given the provisional designation S/1999 U 2.

Confirmed as Uranus XX, it was named after the drunken butler in William Shakespeare's play The Tempest in August 2000.

The orbital parameters suggest that it may belong to the same dynamic cluster as Caliban, suggesting common origin.

See also 

 Uranus' natural satellites
 Irregular satellites

References

External links 
 Stephano Profile by NASA's Solar System Exploration
 David Jewitt pages
  Uranus' Known Satellites (by Scott S. Sheppard)
 MPC: Natural Satellites Ephemeris Service

Moons of Uranus
Irregular satellites
 
19990718
Moons with a retrograde orbit